Terrence Higgins (10 June 1945 – 4 July 1982) was among the first people known to die of an AIDS-related illness in the United Kingdom.

Life
Born in Pembrokeshire, Wales, Higgins left Haverfordwest as a teenager due to feeling alienated because of his sexuality. He lived in London and worked as a Hansard reporter in the House of Commons during the day and as a nightclub barman and disc jockey in the evenings. He travelled to New York and Amsterdam as a DJ in the 1970s. Higgins collapsed at the nightclub Heaven while at work and was admitted to St Thomas' Hospital, London where he died of Pneumocystis pneumonia and progressive multifocal leukoencephalopathy on 4 July 1982.

Legacy
In his memory, Martyn Butler and Rupert Whitaker (Higgins' partner) and Terry's close friend Tony Calvert initiated the formation of the Terry Higgins Trust (later renamed the Terrence Higgins Trust)  in 1982 with a group of concerned community-members and Terry's friends, including Len Robinson and Chris Peel; it was dedicated to preventing the spread of HIV, promoting awareness of AIDS, and providing supportive services to people with the disease.

See also
 Timeline of early AIDS cases

References

Bibliography
"Terrence Higgins" in Robert Aldrich & Garry Wotherspoon. (Eds.) Who's Who in Contemporary Gay and Lesbian History: From World War II to the Present Day, Volume 2. London: Routledge, 2001, pp. 187–188. 

1945 births
1982 deaths
Welsh gay men
People from Haverfordwest
AIDS-related deaths in England
20th-century Welsh LGBT people
Deaths from pneumonia in England
Neurological disease deaths in England